Ellenden Wood is a  biological Site of Special Scientific Interest south of Whitstable in Kent. It is a Nature Conservation Review site, Grade 2. and a Special Area of Conservation

This wood has diverse flora with over 250 species of vascular plants and 300 of fungi. Insects include 3 species which are nationally rare, and there are mammals such as wood mice, dormice and two species of shrew.

Several public footpaths cross the site.

References

Sites of Special Scientific Interest in Kent
Special Areas of Conservation in England
Nature Conservation Review sites
Forests and woodlands of Kent